The KCB is a 30 mm caliber autocannon, developed by Hispano-Suiza as HS.831. When Oerlikon purchased Hispano's armaments division, the gun became KCB.

Development 
HS.831 is a scaled-up version of the 20 mm HS.820 and has much the same general operating principles. It uses the 30x170mm round that was developed for this gun. On ground, the HS.820 was used in combination with the HS.661, a single simple anti-aircraft gun mount, and was also mounted on the AMX-13 DCA, a self-propelled anti-aircraft weapon for the French Army.

In the United Kingdom, BMARC developed A32, a locally operated naval mounting incorporating two HS.831. When the gun was renamed KCB, the A32 became GCM-A series. And LSE (Laurence, Scott & Electricmotors Ltd; presently MSI Defence Systems) also developed a single mount for KCB, which became DS30B. Both GCM-A and DS30B were introduced by the Royal Navy.

The United States Navy designated the twin HS.831 weapons system developed by Emerson Electric as EX-74. This mount was commercialized as the Emerlec 30 and appreciated
by foreign navies.

References

Books 
 
 

Oerlikon-Contraves
30 mm artillery
Autocannon